Public safety diving is underwater diving conducted as part of law enforcement and search and rescue. Public safety divers differ from recreational, scientific and commercial divers who can generally plan the date, time, and location of a dive, and dive only if the conditions are conducive to the task. Public safety divers respond to emergencies 24 hours a day, 7 days a week, and may be required to dive in the middle of the night, during inclement weather, in zero visibility "black water," or in waters polluted by chemicals and biohazards.

Specialized skills
In addition to basic diving skills training, public safety divers require specialized training for recognizing hazards, conducting risk assessments, search procedures, diving in zero visibility, using full-face masks with communication systems, and recovering evidence that is admissible in court. Some of the water they are required to dive in is contaminated, and they may be required to wear vulcanized drysuits, with diving helmets sealed to the suit, and utilize surface supplied air. At times, the decontamination process that takes place out of the water can be longer than the dive time.

Public safety diving personnel
In the US, many public safety divers are volunteers, but career law enforcement or fire rescue personnel also often take on these additional responsibilities as part of their occupation. Firefighters will find the diving equipment has similarities to the full face masks and breathing apparatus worn in smoke filled environments.

Law enforcement personnel are also trained as public safety divers because of their training and experience in handling evidence and presenting evidence in court.

Health and Safety aspects

Jurisdiction

United States
Depending on state legislation, public safety divers in the USA may fall under state or federal occupational safety and health legislation. Federal legislation applies where there is no relevant state legislation and the divers are employees diving as part of their occupation.
If they fall under federal legislation they are exempt (excluded) from specific requirements of 29 CFR Part 1910, Subpart T, Commercial Diving Operations, only during diving activities incidental to police and public-safety functions the purpose of which is to provide search, rescue, or public-safety diving services. The exemption was written to include the ability to deviate from safe diving practices under limited conditions where compliance would be impracticable due to time constraints or the possible consequences of failing to perform the task overwhelm the risks taken using available facilities. This exclusion does not apply during training, recovery operations, searches where there is no reasonable probability of rescue of a living person or there is no real and immediate public safety hazard. The specific federal legislation does not apply to volunteers where there is no employer/employee relationship.

South Africa
In South Africa, public safety diving is within the scope of the Diving regulations of the Occupational Health and Safety Act, 1993.

Environmental impact
In most cases public safety diving itself has little environmental impact. The diving operations generally have a specific purpose, and when that purpose is accomplished, the operation is terminated. In other cases the purpose of the diving operation may be to mitigate a specific environmental threat, like a spillage, and the methods used are chosen to minimise the overall effects of the incident. In some cases there is some adverse effect on the environment, but the goals of the diving operation may be deemed more important than the harm risked, as in the case of rescue operations. Where there is risk, it is often to the diver or diving team.

See also

, a notable instance of public safety divers being part of rescuing non-divers

References

Further reading
 Howard, Eric. Monson, John. (2002) Downtime: An Oral History Of The Lee's Summit Underwater Rescue & Recovery Team.  Bookstand Publishing

External links
More information on public safety divers, their training, and their equipment. 
ERDI – Public Safety Diver Training
PSDiver Magazine Web Site
International Association of Dive Rescue Specialists
Dive Rescue International
Trelleborg - Viking
Kirby Morgan Dive Systems
Naui Worldwide Public Safety Diver Certification 
US Department of Labor OSHA Instruction: Directive number: CPL 02-00-151 

Underwater work